Westhausen is a municipality in the region Heldburger Land in the district of Hildburghausen, in Thuringia, Germany.

References
Norbert Klaus Fuchs: Das Heldburger Land – ein historischer Reiseführer (The Land of Heldburg – a Historical Guide); Bad Langensalza, Verlag Rockstuhl, 2013, 

Municipalities in Thuringia
Hildburghausen (district)
Duchy of Saxe-Meiningen